The Duracz family (eng. Durach, rus./ukr. Дурач) is a Polish szlachta 
family bearing the Odrowąż coat of arms.

Name Spelling
The original Polish spelling is Duracz. A large part of the family moved to Podolia in the 18th century, which with time became a part of Russia, now Ukraine. Russian as well as Ukrainian spelling of the last name is Дурач. In most cases it is transliterated back into Latin as Durach, not preserving the original Polish spelling. Note that there is a German last name Durach, which should not be confused with the name of the descendants of the Duracz family of Russian or Ukrainian background.

Early Origins

The Duracz family (eng. Durach, rus./ukr. Дурач) is a Polish szlachta 
family,
which has its roots in the Świętokrzyskie Province of Poland 
in the 16th and 17th centuries.
At the time the Duracz family was well known as blacksmiths and operators (some times founders) of numerous forges 
around which new villages appeared, two of which in Duraczów in Końskie County
and Duraczów in Kielce County bear the family name to modern days. The city of Skarżysko-Kamienna has grown around the forge founded by 
the Duracz family in 1511, which until the end of the 17th century was called interchangeably as Kamionna and Duracz.
Another notable forge was located at Krynki near Brody.

Walenty Duracz from Kamiona and his family

In 1578 the Duracz family was introduced into the Odrowąż clan 
(see the list of families at the clan article) through the ennoblement of Walenty Duracz from Kamiona
(lat. Valentinus Duracz de Kamiona) by the Polish king Stefan Batory 
for playing one of the leading roles in the construction of the first bridge in Warsaw - 
the Bridge of Zygmunt August. 

Following the ennoblement Walenty was able to purchase 
the village of Sadek near Szydłowiec.
Walenty with his wife Katarzyna had several children including Andrzej, Walenty, Wojciech Zygmunt and Mikolaj. 
After the death of Walenty his wife was living in Szydłowiec.

One of Walenty's sons, Zygmunt Duracz (lat. Sigismundo Duracz) has been a 
szafarz at the court of Stefan Batory. 

Another son of Walenty, also named Walenty Duracz, moved from the family residence 
at Kamiona to Kielce and became an owner of several forges as well as the village 
Dąbrowa in the Kielce area (see the history section of the article on Dąbrowa).

References

Polish noble families